Alessandroni is an Italian surname. Notable people with the surname include:

Alessandro Alessandroni (1925–2017), Italian musician and composer
Hugh Alessandroni (1908–1977), American fencer
Juan Ignacio Alessandroni (born 1988), Argentine professional footballer
Walter E. Alessandroni (died May 8, 1966), Pennsylvania state attorney general, won (posthumously) nomination for lieutenant governor

See also 
 Alessandri
 Alessandrini

Italian-language surnames
Patronymic surnames
Surnames from given names